Vice Admiral Mark Mellett, DSM (born 4 November 1958), is a retired Irish Naval Service admiral and was Chief of Staff of Ireland's Defence Forces from September 2015 until September 2021.

Military career
Mark Mellett is from Castlebar, County Mayo, and joined the Irish Naval Service in November 1976 having served in the then FCÁ (Army Reserve), 5th Motor Sqn (modern-day Cavalry Corps), before being appointed as a Commissioned Officer after a two-year cadetship where he studied at the Cadet School Military College in the Curragh Camp, County Kildare, Cadet School Naval College Haulbowline, Cork in Ireland, and at Britannia Royal Naval College in Dartmouth, England.

His first command was of the LÉ Orla in 1991, he subsequently commanded the LÉ Ciara in 1997 before commanding the Irish Naval Service flagship, LÉ Eithne, in 2005. He became the second Naval Service officer recipient of the Distinguished Service Medal (DSM) in 1994 as Captain of the LÉ Orla for its role in the detention of drug smuggling craft.

Mellett is a qualified navy diver and former member of the specialist Naval Service Diving Section (NSDS).

Mellett served overseas with the Irish Defence Forces as part of the United Nations Interim Force in Lebanon (UNIFIL) in 1989, and with the International Security Assistance Force (ISAF) in Afghanistan in 2004 as a senior North Atlantic Treaty Organization (NATO) Information Operations Officer, where he was credited as being a major player in the success of the 2004 Afghan presidential election – where Hamid Karzai was elected into office – using his diplomacy skills in bringing together the numerous official bodies entrusted with running the democratic elections. He received citations for his service in both Lebanon and Afghanistan.

Mellett has served as Commandant of the Naval College and Associate Head of the National Maritime College of Ireland (NMCI).

Mellett was the Officer Commanding Naval Operations Command (OCNOC) at Naval Headquarters, Haulbowline Naval Base, Cork Harbour prior to his appointment as Flag Officer Commanding the Naval Service (FOCNS) in January 2011, holding the rank of Commodore. As flag officer, his vision was to transform the Irish Naval Service into the "smartest, most innovative and responsive" navy in the world.

In November 2013, Mellett was announced as Deputy Chief of Staff, Support (D COS Sp) at Defence Forces Headquarters by the Department of Defence, promoted to the rank of Rear admiral, and becoming the highest ranking Naval Service officer in the history of the state at the time.

On 29 September 2015, Mellett took over from Lieutenant general Conor O'Boyle (Irish Army) as Chief of Staff of the Defence Forces when Lt Gen O'Boyle retired. Mellett was nominated for the position by Minister for Defence Simon Coveney, approved by the Irish government and appointed by the President of Ireland, who is the Supreme Commander of the Defence Forces. Mellett made Irish military history in becoming the first Defence Forces Chief of Staff from outside the branch of the Army, promoted to the rank of Vice admiral, the naval equivalent of an Irish Army Lieutenant general.

Education
Mellett holds a PhD (2009) in Political Science in Governance from NUI Galway and a Master of Commerce (2002) in Government and Public Policy (Honours) from University College Cork (UCC). He is a distinguished graduate of the United States Naval War College, Newport, Rhode Island (1999), where he was the top graduate of the thirty two attending countries. He was also the top graduate in both the Irish Command and Staff College (1998) and the Royal Naval College, Greenwich (1989).

Mellett is a Fellow of the Nautical Institute (FNI). He has been a visiting professor at the Centre for Applied Research in Security Innovation (CASI) at Liverpool Hope University, and has published in the areas of security, innovation and governance. Mellett is a published research member of the European Security Research Innovation Forum (ESRIF).

He is a founding member of the Irish Maritime and Energy Resource Cluster (IMERC), an institutional cluster encompassing University College Cork and Cork Institute of Technology (CIT). The aim of IMERC is to enhance Defence Forces capability while facilitating innovation, transformation and job creation in the private sector.

Vice Admiral Mellett has been appointed as an Adjunct Professor in the University College Cork (UCC) College of Business & Law.

Personal life
Mellett is married with four children. He is said to be interested in physical fitness, including running, cycling and gym work.

Ranks held

Decorations

References

External links

 Deputy Chief of Staff Support (D COS Sp)

 

 

1958 births
Alumni of the University of Galway
Alumni of University College Cork
Chiefs of Staff of the Defence Forces (Ireland)
Graduates of Britannia Royal Naval College
Graduates of the Royal Naval College, Greenwich
Irish Naval Service personnel
Living people
Military personnel from County Mayo
Naval War College alumni
People from Castlebar
Recipients of the Distinguished Service Medal (Ireland)